Nanjing–Tongling railway or Ningtong railway, is a single-track railroad in eastern China between Nanjing in Jiangsu Province and Tongling in Anhui Province. Major towns along route include Nanjing, Maanshan, Wuhu and Tongling. With the opening of the parallel Nanjing–Anqing intercity railway in 2015, the line is mostly used for freight traffic.

Line description
The line follows the southern bank of the Yangtze River from Nanjing to Tongling.  The eastern third of the line was built in 1935 as the Nanjing–Wuhu railway and the western two-thirds from Wuhu to Tongling was completed in 1968.  In 2010, a second track was  proposed for the Nanjing to Wuhu section.

However, according to the latest news, this railway will remain single track but will be electrified, which will enable freight trains to carry more goods but not improve the average speed on the line.

The opening of the Tongling–Jiujiang railway in 2008, extended the line along the southern bank of the Yangtze beyond Tongling all the way to Jiujiang in Jiangxi Province. As of late 2012, published schedules show direct services from Nanjing to Nanchang and points south and west.

It is now also possible to travel from Shanghai to Chongqing, the capital of R.O.C. between 1937-1945, by train via Shanghai–Nanjing railway, Nanjing–Wuhu–Tongling railway, Tongling–Jiujiang railway, Jiujiang–Wuhan railway, Wuhan–Yichang railway, and Yichang–Chongqing railway. This railway group has become the most important Yangzi River railway system which is along the bank of Yangzi River and across middle part of China from eastern to western parts.

It is proposed to reroute the line in the suburbs of Nanjing to run via Nanjing South railway station through a double-track and electrified section, partly in tunnel. The easement of the old line would be used for an extension of  line 8 of the Nanjing Metro.

Rail connections
 Nanjing: Beijing–Shanghai railway, Nanjing–Qidong railway, Nanjing–Xi'an railway, Shanghai–Nanjing intercity railway, Hefei–Nanjing passenger railway
 Wuhu: Anhui–Jiangxi railway
 Tongling: Tongling–Jiujiang railway

See also

 List of railways in China
 Nanjing–Anqing intercity railway,  a high-speed railway running on a parallel route

References

Railway lines in China
Rail transport in Anhui
Rail transport in Jiangsu